The 1914 Lafayette football team was an American football team that represented Lafayette College as an independent during the 1914 college football season. In its first season under head coach Wilmer G. Crowell, the team compiled an 5–3–2 record. Joseph Diamond was the team captain.  The team played its home games at March Field in Easton, Pennsylvania.

Schedule

References

Lafayette
Lafayette Leopards football seasons
Lafayette football